Andrey Yevgenyevich Tashkov (born July 30, 1957, Moscow, RSFSR, USSR) is a Soviet and Russian film, theater and voice actor. Merited Artist of the Russian Federation (1994).

His parents are film director Yevgeny Tashkov and actress Ekaterina Savinova.

In 1973 he made his debut in the cinema. In 1978 graduated from Boris Shchukin Theatre  Institute.

In October 2008, he signed an open letter in defense and support of the release of the lawyer of the oil company Yukos  Svetlana Bakhmina.

Selected filmography
 Life and Death of Ferdinand Luce (1976) as bellhop in hotel
 Detective (1979) as police sergeant Yevgeny Kulik
 Sashka (1981) as Sashka
 Teenager (1983) as police sergeant Yevgeny Kulik
 Lawyer (1990) as Pavel Arkadyevich Beshmetyev
 White King, Red Queen (1992) as  Nikolay Tyurin
 Flash.ka (2006) as Alexey
 Wedding Ring (2008) as Chameleon
 The Man Who Knew Everything (2009) as Valery Dmitrievich Stefanov
 Boris Godunov (2011) as Patriarch Job of Moscow
 Raid  (2017) as Anton Borodin
 Doctor Lisa (2020) as pharmacist

References

External links
 

1957 births
Living people
Soviet male film actors
Soviet male stage actors
Russian male film actors
Russian male stage actors
Male actors from Moscow
20th-century Russian male actors
21st-century Russian male actors
Russian male television actors
Russian male voice actors